Koniuszowa  is a village in the administrative district of Gmina Korzenna, within Nowy Sącz County, Lesser Poland Voivodeship, in southern Poland.

In the June 2021 European tornado outbreak, the village was struck by a tornado rated F2 on the Fujita scale

Notable people
 Franciszek Gągor, Polish general

References

Villages in Nowy Sącz County